William Corbett (October 11, 1942 – August 10, 2018) was an American poet, essayist, editor, educator, and publisher.

Corbett's work and public readings acknowledge the influence on him of jazz, modernist and imagist poetry (especially William Carlos Williams and Ezra Pound in his later work), the group of poets in Donald Allen's seminal anthology The New American Poetry 1945–1960, many of them from the Black Mountain College community (most notably Allen Ginsberg, Frank O'Hara, James Schuyler, his friends Robert Creeley and John Wieners, and his mentor, Charles Olson), classical Chinese poets (mainly Li Po), and French poetry of the mid-19th to early 20th centuries (especially Guillaume Apollinaire).

Life and work
Corbett served as a teacher in the Expository Writing program at Harvard University and as writer-in-residence in the Program of Writing and Humanistic Studies at Massachusetts Institute of Technology (MIT), where he taught classes focusing on the craft of the personal essay and the creation of poetry. He edited for the small publisher Pressed Wafer, which specializes in poetry broadsides, chapbooks and books.

Corbett edited the letters of James Schuyler and published two memoirs: Philip Guston's Late Work: A Memoir (1994) and Furthering My Education (1997). He wrote frequently on art, and in 1999 published a book on the sculptor John Raimondi. Corbett had been a member of the CUE Art Foundation's Advisory Council since the Foundation opened its doors in 2003. He lived in Boston's South End for most of his adult life, but moved to Brooklyn, New York. Corbett served as the poetry editor of Grand Street and frequently submitted work to local Boston newspapers, including the Boston Phoenix, for which he contributed book reviews. He also taught at New York University.

He was married and had two daughters.

Selected publications
Columbus Square Journal  (Angel Hair Books, 1976) 
Runaway Pond  (Applewood Books, 1982)  
Collected Poems  (National Poetry Foundation, 1984)  
On Blue Note  (Zoland Books, 1989)  
Don't Think: Look  (Zoland Books, 1991)
Literary New England: A History and Guide (Faber & Faber, 1993)
Philip Guston's Late Work: A Memoir  (Zoland Books, 1994) 
New & Selected Poems  (Zoland Books, 1995) 
Furthering My Education  (Zoland Books, 1997)  
New York Literary Lights (Graywolf Press, 1998)  (pbk.)
Boston Vermont  (Zoland Books, 1999)
John Raimondi  (Hudson Hills Press, 1999)  
editor (with Michael Gizzi & Joseph Torra): The Blind See Only This World: Poems for John Wieners (Granary Books/Pressed Wafer, 2000) 
All Prose: Selected Essays and Reviews (Zoland Books, 2001) 
editor: Just The Thing: Selected Letters of James Schuyler 1951-1991 (Turtle Point Press, 2004)  
editor: The Letters of James Schuyler to Frank O'Hara (Turtle Point Press, 2005) 
Opening Day (Hanging Loose Press, 2008)   
Albert York (Pressed Wafer, 2010) 
The Whalen Poem (Hanging Loose Press, 2011)  
Elegies for Michael Gizzi (Kat Ran Press, 2012)

References

External links
[http://www.pshares.org/authors/author-detail.cfm?authorID=312 Author page at Ploughshares] includes links to on-line reviews and poems by Corbett, and reviews of his work from past issues of Ploughshares going back to the Fall of 1971
Pair of Jacks on-line poem by Corbett at Shampoo, Issue 24
THE ROMANCE OF LIFE AND ART an Interview with William Corbett published on-line in Rain Taxi (2005)
On editing James Schuyler Corbett in conversation with Pam Brown, on-line at Jacket MagazineDemon daze: Hart Crane complete on-line review by Corbett of Hart Crane: Complete Poems & Selected Letters ( The Library of America)
Corbett Audio-files @PennSound recordings of Corbett reading at Penn School of Design on February 3, 2005
A letter from William Corbett This letter discusses Charles Olson & was first published in Minutes of the Charles Olson Society #26 (June 1998)
William Corbett at the Boston Phoenix Some of Corbett's contributions to the Boston Phoenix.
In Conversation: Wynn Kramarsky with William Corbett transcript of an interview before an audience at the CUE Art Foundation
Inspiration key for Boston-based poet Bill Corbett this article first appeared on March 22, 2010
Frank Stella 1958 Corbett writes about the Frank Stella exhibition titled Frank Stella 1958'' at the Arthur M. Sackler Museum, Harvard University Cambridge, Massachusetts February 4–May 7, 2006
William Corbett page and poem at the Academy of American Poets

1942 births
2018 deaths
American male poets
20th-century American poets
Harvard University faculty
American art critics
MIT School of Humanities, Arts, and Social Sciences faculty
People from South End, Boston
20th-century American male writers
21st-century American poets
21st-century American male writers
20th-century American non-fiction writers
21st-century American non-fiction writers
American male non-fiction writers